Anton Eriksson (born 5 March 2000) is a Swedish footballer who plays for IFK Norrköping as a defender.

He was bought from GIF Sundsvall in the summer of 2022.

References

External links 
 

2000 births
Living people
Swedish footballers
Umeå FC players
GIF Sundsvall players
IFK Norrköping players
Ettan Fotboll players
Superettan players
Allsvenskan players
Association football defenders